Christianity is the predominant religion in Serbia. The Constitution of Serbia defines it as a secular state with guaranteed religious freedom. Eastern Orthodox Christians comprise 84.5% of country's population with 6,079,396 members. The Serbian Orthodox Church is the largest and traditional church of the country, adherents of which are overwhelmingly Serbs. Public schools in Serbia allow religious teaching, most commonly with the Serbian Orthodox Church. Serbian public holidays include the religious celebrations of Eastern Orthodox Christians. Other Orthodox Christian communities in Serbia include Montenegrins, Romanians, Macedonians and Bulgarians. The Catholic Church is prominent in north Vojvodina amongst the Hungarian minority. Protestantism is most largely found in Slovak populations within Bački Petrovac and Kovačica. Christianity first arrived in Serbia in the 9th century. It became state-religion in the 9th century when Serbia began to identify as a Christian country. In a 2011 census, 91.22% of Serbians identified as Christian.

History

Early Christianity

Saints Florus and Laurus are venerated as Christian martyrs, and lived in the 2nd century in Ulpiana (Lipljan), in modern Serbia. According to traditions, they were twin brothers from Constantinople who were employed to build a pagan temple. They gave their salaries to the poor and are said to have cured the son of Mamertin, the local pagan priest, who then converted to Christianity. The temple was reconstructed into a Church, which prompted local pagans to kill the 300 Christians, including all aforementioned.

During the Diocletianic Persecution in 304, Sirmium became a place of martyrdom for saint Irenaeus, Anastasia and Fausta. Not much before 313 while emperor Licinius was present in Singidunum, he oversaw trial and murder of deacon Hermylus and Stratonicus whose bodies were thrown in the Danube but resurfaced downriver and were later buried by Christians and venerated as saints. Successor of Irenaeus as bishop of Sirmium was Domnus who attended the First Council of Nicaea. By the mid 4th century, Christian communities on territory of modern-day Serbia were numerous and influential. Sirmium, Singidunum, Naissus, Viminacium, Remesiana, Horreum Margi, Margum and Ulpiana are all mentioned as bishoprics by 343. Bishops Germinius of Sirmium and Ursacius of Singidunum were influential in then ongoing Arian controversy. Four ecclesiastical Councils of Sirmium were important events for whole Christendom. Bishop Nicetas of Remesiana during his long tenure (366-420) contributed much to the spread of Christianity in the region and earliest mention of monastic communities dates from his time.

After the Edict of Milan (313), Kosovo and Metohia came under the jurisdiction of the Thessalonian vicariate; indicated in a letter from Pope Innocent I to the Thessalonian vicar Rufus in 412 that the vicariate included the area of Dardania. Bishopric of Sirmium lost much influence once Huns raided the city in 441/442. In 535 a new archdiocese of Justiniana Prima was formed and was given jurisdiction over most of aforementioned bishoprics. Many new churches and basilicas were built during the reign of emperor Justinian I. However mere decades later entire established ecclesiastic structure collapsed under the impact of Avar raids and Slavic settlement that followed. The last known archbishop of Justiniana Prima and indeed of any bishopric on territory of modern-day Serbia for centuries to come was Ioannes (c. 595-602/3)

Early Middle Ages
The Serbs were baptised during the reign of Heraclius (610–641) by "elders of Rome" according to Constantine Porphyrogenitus in his annals (r. 913–959).

In 733, Leo III attaches Illyricum to Patriarch Anastasius of Constantinople.

The forming of Christianity as state-religion dates to the time of Eastern Orthodox missionaries (Saints) Cyril and Methodius during Basil I (r. 867–886), who baptised the Serbs sometime before sending imperial admiral Nikita Orifas to Knez Mutimir for aid in the war against the Saracens in 869, after acknowledging the suzerainty of the Byzantine Empire. The fleets and land forces of Zahumlje, Travunia and Konavli were sent to fight the Saracens who attacked the town of Ragusa (Dubrovnik) in 869, on the immediate request of Basil I, who was asked by the Ragusians for help. 
A Serbian bishopric (Diocese of Ras) may have been founded in Stari Ras in 871 by Serbian Knez Mutimir, confirmed by the Council of Constantinople in 879–80.

The adherence is evident in the tradition of theophoric names in the next generation of Serbian monarchs and nobles; Petar Gojniković, Stefan Mutimirović, Pavle Branović. Mutimir maintained the communion with the Eastern Church (Constantinople) when Pope John VIII invited him to recognize the jurisdiction of the bishopric of Sirmium. The Serbs and Bulgarians adopt the Old Slavonic liturgy instead of the Greek.

Notable early church buildings include the Monastery of Archangel Michael in Prevlaka (Ilovica), built at the beginning of the 9th century, on the location of older churches of three-nave structure with three apses to the East, dating from the 3rd and 6th centuries, Bogorodica Hvostanska (6th century) and Church of Saints Peter and Paul.

A Seal of Strojimir (died between 880 and 896), the brother of Mutimir, was bought by the Serbian state in an auction in Germany. The seal has a Patriarchal cross in the center and Greek inscriptions that say: "Strojimir" (CTPOHMIP) and "God, Help Serbia".

In 1019, the Archbishopric of Ohrid is formed after the Byzantines conquers the First Bulgarian Empire. The Greek language replaces the Slavic. Serbia is ecclesiastically administered into several dioceses; The Diocese of Ras, mentioned in 1019, becomes part of the Ohrid archbishopric and encompassed the areas of central Serbia, by the rivers Raska, Ibar and Lim, evident in the second charter of Basil II (r. 976–1025). Among the first bishops are Leontius (fl. 1123–1126), Cyril (fl. 1141–1143), Euthemius (fl. 1170) and Kalinik (fl. 1196). It joined the autocephalous Archbishopric of Zica in 1219, at the time of Saint Sava.

The Diocese (Eparhy) of Prizren is mentioned in 1019, in the first charter of Basil II.

Denominations

Eastern Orthodoxy

Most of the citizens of Serbia are adherents of the Serbian Orthodox Church, while the Romanian Orthodox Church is also present in parts of Vojvodina inhabited by ethnic Romanian minority. Besides Serbs, other adherents of Eastern Orthodoxy include: Romanians, Macedonians, Ukrainians, Bulgarians, Russians and Greeks..

The identity of ethnic Serbs was historically largely based on Eastern Orthodoxy and on the Serbian Orthodox Church, to the extent that some Serb nationalists claimed that those who are not its faithful are not Serbs. However, the conversion of the south Slavs from paganism to Christianity took place before the Great Schism, the split between the Greek East and the Latin West. After the Schism, those who lived under the Eastern Orthodox sphere of influence became Orthodox and those who lived under the Catholic sphere of influence became Catholic. Some ethnologists consider that the distinct Serb and Croat identities relate to religion rather than ethnicity. With the arrival of the Ottoman Empire, some Serbs and Croats converted to Islam. This was particularly, but not wholly, so in Bosnia. The best known Muslim Serb is probably either Mehmed Paša Sokolović or Meša Selimović.

Serbian Orthodox Church

The church is one of the autocephalous Orthodox Christian churches, ranking sixth in order of seniority after Constantinople, Alexandria, Antioch, Jerusalem, and Russia. It is the second oldest Slavic Eastern Orthodox Church in the world (after the Bulgarian Orthodox Church).

The Eastern Orthodox Church is the dominant church in Serbia, Montenegro and Republika Srpska entity of Bosnia and Herzegovina, with more than 84% of the population being adherents in all three. It is organized into metropolises and eparchies located primarily in Serbia, Bosnia and Herzegovina, Montenegro and Croatia, but also in surrounding countries, and all over the world. Since many Serbs have emigrated to foreign countries, there are now Serbian Orthodox communities worldwide.

The Serbian Orthodox Church is an autocephalous, or ecclesiastically independent, member of the Eastern Orthodox communion. The Serbian Patriarch serves as first among equals in his church; the current patriarch is Irinej. The Church achieved autocephalous status in 1219 under the leadership of St. Sava, becoming independent Archbishopric of Žiča. Its status was elevated to that of a patriarchate in the 14th century, and was known afterwards as the Patriarchate of Peć. This patriarchate was abolished by the Ottoman Turks in the 1766 century. The modern Serbian Orthodox Church was established in 1920 after the unification of the Patriarchate of Karlovci and the Metropolitanate of Belgrade.

The Serbian Orthodox Church owns many significant Christian relics, such as the right hand of John the Baptist, Saint George's hand and skull parts, Holy Cross segments, St. Paraskevi's finger and body of St. Basil of Ostrog, among others.

Catholic Church

The Catholic Church is present mostly in the northern part of Vojvodina, notably in the municipalities with Hungarian ethnic majority and in the polyethnic municipalities of Subotica and Bečej. The ethnic groups whose members are mostly adherents of the Catholic Church are: Hungarians, Croats, Bunjevci, Germans, Slovenes, Czechs, Šokci, Poles, etc. A smaller number of Romani, Yugoslavs, and Slovaks are also adherents of the Catholic Church. In the disputed region of Kosovo, Catholics constitute 2.2% of the population, according to the 2011 census. The ethnic Rusyns and a smaller part of the ethnic Ukrainians are adherents of the Eastern Catholic Church.

Protestant Christianity

The largest concentration of the Protestant Christians in Serbia is in the municipalities of Bački Petrovac and Kovačica, where the absolute or relative majority of the population are ethnic Slovaks, most of them adherents of Protestant Christianity. Some members of other ethnic groups (especially Serbs in absolute terms and Hungarians and Germans in proportional terms) are also adherents of various forms of Protestant Christianity.

There are various Protestant groups in the country, including Methodists, Seventh-day Adventists and Evangelical Baptists (Nazarene). Many of these groups are situated in the culturally diverse province of Vojvodina. Prior to World War II, the number of Protestants in the region was larger.

Western Orthodox Church
The Western Orthodox (before 1985 known as Old Catholic) Church existed in Yugoslavia since 1921. 
Nowadays, the only representative of Old Catholic Churches in Serbia is Orthodox - Old Catholic General vicariate of St. Methodius, a canonically established organ of World Council of National Old Catholic Churches (distinct from The Utrecht Union). It is a member of World Council of Churches and was granted autonomy. In 2015., General Vicariate of St. Methodius was recognized as a legal successor of former Western Orthodox Church in Yugoslavia, because they share the same dogmas. 
Serbian Orthodox Church doesn't look at General Vicariate as its sister church, but as an opponent.

Jehovah's Witnesses
The Jehovah's Witnesses are active in Serbia since 1930. This community have its seat in Zemun. In 1937, the authorities of the Kingdom of Yugoslavia banned the activity of the community, but it was reestablished in 1953. According to 2002 census, there was 2,191 Jehovah's Witnesses in Serbia, while according to 2009 estimation their number was 3,871.

Latter Day Saints
The Church of Jesus Christ of Latter-day Saints (LDS Church) are active in Serbia since 1992 and Seat of the LDS community in Serbia is in Belgrade. There is also LDS meetinghouse in Novi Sad. The Book of Mormon is also translated into Serbian language and printed in Serbian Cyrillic script.

References

Sources

External links

 Early-Christian monuments on the eastern slopes of the Kopaonik mountain
 Orthodox - Old Catholic General vicariate of St. Methodius